Wallace Owen (1864 – after 1888) was an English footballer who played for Stoke.

Career
Owen started his career with Stoke St Peter's before joining Stoke in 1886. He became a useful forward and scored four goals in six FA Cup matches in two seasons for Stoke. With Stoke joining the Football League in June 1888, Owen instead moved on to the Combination with Long Eaton Rangers.

He may also have made one FA Cup and one Staffordshire Senior Cup appearance for Stoke's rivals Burslem Port Vale in October 1886. A forward by the name of 'Owen' wore the number 8 shirt for the "Valeites" for two games and played as a forward, though his first name and history went unrecorded.

Career statistics

References

1864 births
Year of death missing
Footballers from Stoke-on-Trent
English footballers
Association football forwards
Stoke City F.C. players
Long Eaton Rangers F.C. players
Port Vale F.C. players